Djenaba Baradji (born 16 December 1995) is a French-born Malian footballer who plays as a midfielder for the Mali women's national team.

International career
Baradji competed for Mali at the 2018 Africa Women Cup of Nations, playing in two matches.

References

1995 births
Living people
Citizens of Mali through descent
Malian women's footballers
Women's association football midfielders
Mali women's international footballers
People from Mantes-la-Jolie
Footballers from Yvelines
French women's footballers
Black French sportspeople
French sportspeople of Malian descent